The 2005 Pittsburgh Steelers–Indianapolis Colts playoff game was a National Football League Divisional Round playoff game between the sixth-seeded Pittsburgh Steelers and the top-seeded Indianapolis Colts, taking place during the 2005–06 NFL playoffs at the RCA Dome in Indianapolis, Indiana on January 15, 2006.

Although memorable for other reasons, the game is best remembered for a late-game fumble by Steelers running back Jerome Bettis just as the Steelers appeared to have the game won, which was recovered by Colts player Nick Harper and returned near midfield until Ben Roethlisberger made a shoestring tackle to prevent what would have likely been a game-winning touchdown for the Colts. The play, which became known both as The Immaculate Redemption (as a play on the earlier Immaculate Reception that the Steelers were on the winning side of) and The Tackle (not to be confused with an earlier play during Super Bowl XXXIV), has since entered Pittsburgh sports lore, and while initially appearing to be fatal helped the Steelers pull off an upset victory over the Colts, becoming the first-ever number six seed to advance to the AFC Championship Game (or NFC for that matter) en route to the team's victory in Super Bowl XL, its first Super Bowl victory in 26 years. It also marked changes to the Colts organization that resulted in its first Super Bowl victory since moving to Indianapolis in 1984 only one year later.

The game has been featured on NFL Films Game of the Week, and is often marked as one of the greatest NFL games of all-time, as well as one of the biggest upsets in NFL history.

Background
Entering the 2005 NFL season, both teams were expected to be playoff contenders following strong seasons from the year before. How both teams entered the playoffs would be different, however.

Pittsburgh Steelers
Pittsburgh attempted to replicate its success from 2004, when it finished 15-1 behind one of the league's stingiest defenses, a strong running game, and the unexpected success of rookie quarterback Ben Roethlisberger before losing to the New England Patriots in the 2004 AFC Championship game. (A game that would later be referenced in the Patriots Spygate scandal.) The Steelers started off 7-2 before a midseason injury to Roethlisberger led to him missing three games and the Steelers going on a three-game losing streak. A four-game winning streak at the end of the season helped the Steelers barely edge off the Kansas City Chiefs for the AFC's final playoff spot.

Finishing 11–5, the team had tied the rival Cincinnati Bengals for the AFC North division title, but lost the division to the Bengals on tiebreakers despite splitting the season series. The two teams would meet in the AFC Wild Card Round, best remembered for Bengals quarterback Carson Palmer tearing his ACL on the game's second play from scrimmage on a controversial hit by Steelers defensive end Kimo von Oelhoffen, which at the time was legal and didn't involve a penalty. The Steelers won 31–17, advancing to face the Colts.

Indianapolis Colts
For the Colts, 2005 marked the fourth season of head coach Tony Dungy, after he had retooled the defense to his Tampa 2 style while leaving the high-octane offense, led by quarterback Peyton Manning, untouched. While the Colts made the playoffs in each of Dungy's first three years in Indianapolis, the team struggled to get past the rival Patriots, mainly due to the subpar defense that was in place prior to Dungy's arrival. The team started off 13-0 before losing two of its final three games, winning the AFC South and finishing an NFL-best 14–2, having home-field advantage throughout the playoffs, as well as a first-round bye.

2005 also marked the eighth season for both Manning and Colts kicker Mike Vanderjagt. Vanderjagt, who was the NFL's all-time most accurate kicker after eight seasons, had a contentious relationship with Manning at best. Following the Colts' elimination from the postseason in 2002, Vanderjagt made critical comments about Manning and Dungy to a Canadian television station. Vanderjagt questioned Manning's leadership skills and was critical of Dungy's level-headed temperament. During an interview at the 2003 Pro Bowl, the normally stoic Manning referred to Vanderjagt as the team's "idiot kicker" and accused him of being intoxicated during the interview. However, the two appeared to have made amends (at least publicly) by the 2005 playoffs.

Pregame news and notes
The matchup would be a rematch of the two teams' Week 12 matchup on Monday Night Football, which the Colts handily defeated the Steelers at the RCA Dome 26–7, during the Steelers aforementioned three-game losing streak and was also Roethlisberger's first game back from injury. Steelers receiver Hines Ward said after that game, which brought the Colts up to 11–0, that "It’s tough to go undefeated, but they have the potential."

The game would mark the fifth postseason meeting between the two teams, and the first to take place in Indianapolis; the two teams met at Memorial Stadium in Baltimore in 1976 (during the Colts' time in Baltimore) while the other three matchups (1975, 1995, & 1996) were all in Pittsburgh at Three Rivers Stadium, the first one being the introduction of the Terrible Towel. This would be the only postseason meeting between the two at the RCA Dome; the two teams have yet to meet in the postseason at their current stadiums, Acrisure Stadium and Lucas Oil Stadium. The Steelers won all previous postseason matchups.

The night before the game, Colts cornerback Nick Harper was involved in an altercation with his wife that resulted in him getting cut with a knife in his right leg, requiring stitches. Harper nearly missed the game, but was able to play and would foreshadow his notable play in the game.

The game had been expected to be a victory for the Colts in a possible matchup to face the Patriots in the AFC Championship game the following week and leading a "passing the torch" moment between Manning and Tom Brady. However, the Denver Broncos defeated the Patriots the previous day 27–13, giving the Patriots their first postseason loss during the Brady–Belichick era. The victor would face the Broncos instead, either at home (for the Colts) or in Denver (for the Steelers) at Invesco Field at Mile High.

The Game
The Steelers stunned the Colts home crowd at the RCA Dome by driving 84 yards and scoring on their opening possession. Pittsburgh quarterback Ben Roethlisberger completed six consecutive passes for 76 yards, including a 36-yard completion to tight end Heath Miller and a 6-yard touchdown pass to Antwaan Randle El. Later in the first quarter, Roethlisberger's 45-yard completion to Hines Ward moved the ball to the Colts 8-yard line, and they scored another touchdown with his 7-yard pass to Miller, increasing the Steelers' lead to 14–0.

Five minutes into the second quarter, Indianapolis managed to get a good drive going, advancing the ball 96 yards to the Steelers 2-yard line and taking 9:39 off the clock, but were forced to settle for a field goal from Mike Vanderjagt, cutting their deficit to 14–3.

Late in the third quarter, Steelers linebacker James Farrior (who finished the game with eight tackles and 2.5 sacks) sacked Manning at the Colts 1-yard line on third down, and Randle El returned Hunter Smith's ensuing punt 20 yards to the Indianapolis 30. Five plays later, Jerome Bettis scored a 1-yard touchdown run, making the score 21–3. But this time, Indianapolis struck back, driving 72 yards in six plays and scoring with Manning's 50-yard touchdown pass to tight end Dallas Clark. During the drive, Manning infamously waved off the punt team being sent on the field by Dungy on 4th & 2 at the Colts 36 yard line, which Dungy allowed; the ensuing snap led to a 13-yard pass play to Brandon Stokley to eventually set up Clark's touchdown. The Steelers were forced to punt on their ensuing drive, but only after taking over seven minutes off the clock, leaving just 6:03 left in the game by the time Indianapolis got the ball back.

One play after the punt, an interception by Pittsburgh safety Troy Polamalu was overturned by instant replay (a reversal that the league would later admit was a mistake). Taking advantage of his second chance, Manning completed a 9-yard pass to Clark, a 20-yard pass to Marvin Harrison, and a 24-yard pass to Reggie Wayne, moving the ball to the Steelers 3-yard line. Running back Edgerrin James finished the drive with a 3-yard touchdown run, and then Manning threw a pass to Wayne for a successful 2-point conversion, cutting the Colts deficit to 21–18. The Steelers were forced to punt on their ensuing drive. But with 1:20 left in the game, Manning was sacked on fourth and 16 by Joey Porter at the Colts' 2-yard line, and the ball was turned over to the Steelers on downs.

Bettis's fumble

At this point, the game appeared to be over. However, the Steelers were forced to advance the ball towards another score instead of taking a quarterback kneel because the Colts still had all three timeouts remaining. A field goal would put the Steelers up by six and force the Colts to score a touchdown, while a touchdown would essentially seal the win for Pittsburgh. A forward pass ran the risk of an interception, and with the Steelers only needing two yards to score, combined with Bettis' historically low fumble percentage, the Steelers opted to run the ball in for the game-winning score.

But on Pittsburgh's first play, in which Bettis tried to punch it in for an insurance touchdown, he fumbled for the first time all season when linebacker Gary Brackett popped it from Bettis' hands with his helmet. Indianapolis defensive back Nick Harper recovered the ball and appeared to be on his way for an Indy touchdown that would have given the Colts the lead when Roethlisberger barely made a season saving tackle at the Colts' 42-yard line, recovering from getting spun around to grab Harper's ankle, which brought him down; Jerame Tuman downed Harper to end  the play.

Eventually, the Colts then advanced to the Pittsburgh 28-yard line, but key stops by rookie Bryant McFadden while trying to go for a touchdown forced the Colts to go for a field goal. However, Vanderjagt, who had been perfect at home in the playoffs, subsequently missed a 46-yard game-tying field goal attempt wide right with 17 seconds left and evoking another infamous postseason moment, and the Steelers ran out the clock. Vanderjagt, who took his helmet off on the field and threw it down in disgust, would be penalized for unsportsmanlike conduct.

Aftermath

Pittsburgh
The Steelers, buoyed by the momentum of pulling off one of the biggest upsets in NFL history, went to Denver to defeat the Broncos 34–17, giving head coach Bill Cowher his first win in the AFC Championship Game on the road and his only decisive win in the games, having previously played the game at home five times (1994, 1995, 1997, 2001, & 2004) losing four of those matchups and only winning the 1995 AFC Championship Game (coincidentally against the Colts) on a dropped Hail Mary pass by then-Colts quarterback Jim Harbaugh to Aaron Bailey. The Steelers advanced to Super Bowl XL, their first Super Bowl appearance since Super Bowl XXX ten years prior. The Steelers defeated the Seattle Seahawks 21–10 to win their fifth Vince Lombardi Trophy and the first since the Steelers dynasty years of the 1970s. Bettis retired immediately after the game and was inducted into the Pro Football Hall of Fame in 2015; Cowher resigned one year later after 15 seasons as Steelers head coach and was elected into the Pro Football Hall of Fame himself in 2020.

The Steelers victory marked the first time since the playoffs were expanded to six teams per conference in 1990 that a number six-seeded team defeated the top seed in the playoffs; only the strike shortened season New York Jets (in 1982), Philadelphia Eagles (in 2008), Green Bay Packers (in 2010), and Tennessee Titans (in 2019) have since repeated this feat, with the Packers going on to win Super Bowl XLV (coincidentally, beating the Steelers in that game); the NFL expanded to seven teams per conference for the 2020 NFL season, making the feat more likely. In the second year of the expanded format, the 49ers became the next team to do so.

Indianapolis
Vanderjagt's missed field goal would be his last play as a Colt, as his contract expired and the Colts (fed up with his off-field antics at this point) elected not to renew his deal, replacing him with former Patriots kicker Adam Vinatieri, who would go on to have a second career with the Colts and become both the Patriots and Colts' all-time leading scorer. Vanderjagt would sign with the Dallas Cowboys but would be cut midseason and left the NFL altogether.

Along with Vanderjagt, it would also mark the last game in a Colts uniform for running back Edgerrin James, who departed for the Arizona Cardinals via free agency after becoming the Colts' all-time leading rusher.

Despite losing James, replacing Vanderjagt with Vinatieri would prove to make a difference for the Colts, who would go on to win Super Bowl XLI the following season. Despite no longer being on the team, Colts owner Jim Irsay still sent James a Super Bowl ring. James would eventually play in the Super Bowl as a member of the Cardinals, losing Super Bowl XLIII against the Steelers 27–23.

Quotes

Tunch Ilkin's Reactions
The game would be notable for former Steelers offensive lineman and then-current Pittsburgh Steelers Radio Network analyst Tunch Ilkin for his quotes regarding the game near the end:

Hillgrove and Ilkin both discussed how accurate Vanderjagt had been during the season, with Ilkin saying, "Law of averages says he misses this one". He went to correct himself again following Vanderjagt's miss:

Ilkin became known within a week for jumping the gun on a Steelers victory, so he waited until the Steelers-Broncos game was clearly decided before making similar comments about "going to Detroit".

CBS
The national broadcasting team of Dick Enberg and Dan Dierdorf on CBS, while more neutral, were equally as surprised as the local broadcasting teams of the events late in the game:

Coincidentally, Enberg had also called the two teams' aforementioned previous postseason matchup in the 1995 AFC Championship Game while working for NBC and even referenced that game's last play during the Colts' final drive.

See also
 Immaculate Reception
 Miracle at the Meadowlands
 Miracle at the New Meadowlands
 Wide Right
 The Fumble
 2005 Pittsburgh Steelers season
 2005 Indianapolis Colts season
 Pittsburgh sports lore

References

2005 National Football League season
National Football League playoff games
Pittsburgh Steelers postseason
Indianapolis Colts postseason
January 2006 sports events in the United States
2006 in sports in Indiana